Koninklijke Football Club Dessel Sport, or KFC Dessel Sport, is a Belgian association football club based in Dessel in the province of Antwerp.

Current squad 
Updated 11 August, 2022

Coaches 
 André Rooymans (1964–1965)
 Alfons Leysen (1965–1967)
 Charlie Feyen (1967–1971)
 Robert Willems (1971–1973)
 Staf Kauwenberghs (1973–1975)
 Robert Willems (1975–1977)
 Willy Van Cleemput (1977–1978)
 Kamiel Van Damme (1978–1981)
 Jos Weyts (1981)
 Pierre Berx (1981–1982)
 Julien Cools (1982–1983)
 Swat Van Casteren (1983–1984)
 René Desaeyere (1984–1985)
 Robert Willems (1985–1986)
 Willy Elsen (1986–1988)
 Herman Franssen (1988–1990)
 Kamiel Van Damme (1990–1990)
 Herman Franssen (1990–1992)
 Marcel Sterckx (1992–1992)
 Luc Maes (1992–1993)
 Dirk Verbraken (1993–1999)
  Colin Andrews (1999–2000)
 Herman Helleputte (2000–2001)
 Dirk Verbraken (2001–2003)
 Gerard Plessers (2003)
 Ives Serneels (2003–2006)
 Ivo Toelen (2006–2007)
 Luc Reumers (2007)
 Dirk Verbraken (2007–2008)
 Valère Billen (2008–2009)
 Dany David (2009)
 Michel Kenis (2009–2010)
 Stijn Vreven (2010–2013)
 Guido Brepoels (2013–2014)
 Bart Wilmssen (2014–...)

References 

Official website

Association football clubs established in 1926
Football clubs in Belgium
1926 establishments in Belgium